Itala is a comune (municipality) in the Metropolitan City of Messina in the Italian region Sicily, located about  east of Palermo and about  southwest of Messina.   

Itala borders the following municipalities: Alì, Alì Terme, Fiumedinisi, Messina, Scaletta Zanclea.

References

External links
 Official website

Cities and towns in Sicily